Lillie May Carroll Jackson (May 25, 1889 – July 5, 1975), pioneer civil rights activist, organizer of the Baltimore branch of the NAACP. Invariably known as "Dr. Lillie", "Ma Jackson", and the "mother of the civil rights movement", Lillie May Carroll Jackson pioneered the tactic of non-violent resistance to racial segregation used by Martin Luther King Jr. and others during the early civil rights movement.

Early life
Born in Baltimore, Maryland, Lillie May Carroll Jackson was the seventh child of Methodist Minister Charles Henry Carroll (who claimed descent from Charles Carroll of Carrollton, a signer of the Declaration of Independence) and Amanda Bowen Carroll who was said to be the granddaughter of a free-born African chief named John Bowen. After completing her public school education and graduating from the Colored High School and Normal School in 1909, Jackson became a second-grade teacher at the old Biddle Street School.

Family history
Jackson grew up singing soprano in the choir of the Sharp Street Methodist Church. On an occasion when the church was used to show religious motion pictures, she met Methodist evangelist Keiffer Albert Jackson of Carrollton, Mississippi. A promoter of religious films, Jackson requested that she sing a song entitled "The Holy City". Years later, in 1910, they were married. Once they were married they began to travel together, she sang while the silent pictures were shown and lectured wherever he showed his films.

Upon the arrival of their first child, the Jackson family settled in Baltimore. In addition to her oldest child, Virginia, Mrs. Jackson gave birth to two other girls, Juanita Elizabeth (born January 2, 1913) and Marion, followed by one son, Bowen Keiffer.

During 1918 Jackson experienced a life changing crisis. She underwent emergency surgery for mastoiditis. The procedure was so extensive her doctor told her that he "had removed more decayed bone from her head than he thought possible to survive". As a result, the right side of her face was permanently disfigured. Most photos of her henceforth were taken from the left side to conceal her scars.

Jackson was literally the mother of the civil rights movement. Her daughter Juanita, the first African-American woman to practice law in Maryland, married Clarence Mitchell Jr. September 7, 1938. He was the NAACP’s chief Washington lobbyist from 1950 to 1978 and became known as the "101st U.S. Senator." Mitchell's brother Parren Mitchell was the first African-American congressman from Maryland. Juanita and Clarence had four sons: Clarence M. Mitchell, III (a former state senator), Michael Bowen Mitchell Sr. (former state senator and Baltimore City Council member), Keiffer Jackson Mitchell, M.D., and George Davis Mitchell. Kieffer Mitchell's son, Keiffer J. Mitchell Jr. was a Baltimore City Council member and the Maryland House of Delegates. Clarence M. Mitchell, IV was a member of the Maryland State Senate.

Civil rights activism
As a successful owner of rental property, Jackson was free to engage in activities which led to community improvement. She sponsored the City-Wide Young Peoples forum with her daughter Juanita in the leadership in the early 1930s. The forum conducted a campaign to end racial segregation beginning with the grassroots "Buy Where You Can Work" campaign of 1931. Jackson and  her daughter Juanita along with the forums' members encouraged African-American residents of Baltimore to shop only at businesses where they could work, boycotting businesses with discriminatory hiring practices. The campaign's success led to similar protests in other cities around the country.

At one forum gathering, Charles Hamilton Houston, informed the audience "we could sue Jim Crow out of Maryland". Subsequently, Carl Murphy of the Afro-American newspaper suggested that Lillie join forces with the NAACP. That was the beginning of her 35-year tenure with the NAACP, in a role as president of the Baltimore branch in 1935, a position she held until retirement in 1970. 1934 saw the beginning of Thurgood Marshall's employment with the Baltimore NAACP branch. The next year he won a landmark case financed by the Baltimore NAACP, Murray v. Pearson, removing the color barrier from admissions to the University of Maryland School of Law. In 1946 she founded the Maryland state conference of the NAACP  and was elected to the National Board of Directors in 1948.

In 1938 the NAACP won a historic legal challenge to racial barriers in publicly funded institutions. A court judgment overturned city policy assuring all Baltimore city school teachers received equal pay. Jackson's 1942 movement to register black voters began a shift in city politics. That same year she was named to Maryland's first Interracial Commission. She was also fundamental to Baltimore being the first Southern city to integrate its schools after the landmark Brown v. Board of Education decision. Baltimore's Fair Employment Practices law was passed in 1958. She was such a force in Maryland and Baltimore politics that Governor Theodore McKeldin was noted to have said of her, "I'd rather have the devil after me than Mrs. Jackson. Give her what she wants."

Ultimately, her efforts built the Baltimore NAACP into the largest branch of the organization in the United States with a peak membership of 17,600.

Death and legacy
Jackson died from a myocardial infarction and was interred at Mount Auburn Cemetery in Baltimore.

Jackson's will called for the home she lived in for twenty-two years, 1320 Eutaw Place in Baltimore, to be turned into a museum. As the only museum named after a woman and the only civil rights museum in the state of Maryland, it serves as a repository of civil rights artifacts including documents, framed memorabilia and household furnishings. Prominent amongst these was a life-sized photo of Jackson with Rosa Parks just inside the building's entrance.

Upon its 1976 opening the museum enjoyed a modest flow of visitors. By mid 1990 its maintenance had become untenable to the extent that the structure was no longer viable as a museum. In 1997 Morgan State University took responsibility for the facility and as curators placed its contents in storage. The facility then became dormant, awaiting sufficient matching funds to put in use a grant which was received from the state of Maryland.  A re-opening of the museum is currently planned for June 2016.

In 1986, Jackson was posthumously inducted into the Maryland Women's Hall of Fame.

Bibliography
 Hathaway, Phyllis.  "Lillie May Jackson," Notable Maryland Women, ed. Winifred G. Helmes (Maryland: Tidewater Publishers, 1977), 187-191.
 Williams, Juan. Thurgood Marshall: American Revolutionary. New York: Random House, 1998.
 Davis, Michael D. and Clark, Hunter R. Thurgood Marshall: Warrior At The Bar, Rebel On The Bench. New York: Carol Publishing Group, 1992.
 Aldred, Lisa. Thurgood Marshall: Supreme Court Justice. New York: Chelsea House Publishers, 1990.
 Hughes, Langston. Fight For Freedom: The Story of the NAACP. New York: W.W. Norton & Co., 1962. 176-179.

References

External links
 Baltimore City Paper Online "Charmed Life:  Mother Figure" by Tom Chalkley
 Dr Lillie May Carroll Jackson (1889 - 1975) - Find A Grave Memorial
 Mitchell Family of Civil Rights Activists Gives Papers to Library (March 24, 1997) - Library of Congress Information Bulletin:
 Political pioneers: Mitchell family's influence resonates in Baltimore and beyond
 Lillie Carroll Jackson (1889-1975)
 Baltimore Branch of the National Association for the Advancement of Colored People (NAACP)
 Baltimore Sun bio

African-American activists
Burials at Mount Auburn Cemetery (Baltimore, Maryland)
Nonviolence advocates
People from Baltimore
1889 births
1975 deaths
NAACP activists
Women in Maryland politics
Carroll family